Typisch Schürzenjäger is a pop/rock album by the Austrian band Schürzenjäger. It was released in 1993 by BMG Ariola Media GmbH.

Track listing

 "Typisch für mi" ("Typical for Me") — 2:33
 "Auf einmal warst du da" ("All at Once You Were There") — 3:27
 "Nakkapazzi" — 2:53
 "Ein Tiroler wollte lieben" ("A Tyrolean Wanted to Love") — 2:43
 "Gestern wird morgen" ("Yesterday Becomes Tomorrow") — 2:50
 "In der Prärie der Phantasie" ("In the Prairie of Fantasy") — 4:18
 "Dafür mach ma Musik" ("For This We Make Music") — 3:09
 "Wenn die Nacht kommt" ("When the Night Comes") — 3:09
 "Die gelben Seiten" ("Yellow Pages") — 3:37
 "Jede Nacht a lange Nacht" ("Every Night a Long Night") — 2:23
 "He, Hejo..." — 2:50
 "Jeden Herzschlag wert (Für Anni)" ("Worth Every Heartbeat (For Anni)") — 4:01

Track notes
"Jeden Herzschlag wert (Für Anni)" is Peter Steinlechner's personal song for his wife Anni, who died shortly before the recording began.

1993 albums